It is the 2021–22 season of the Women's Football team of Galatasaray Sports Club.

Overview

September 2021
On 18 September 2021, the Galatasaray Women's Football Team was introduced at the event held at Galatasaray High School. Before the launch, President Burak Elmas came to class 12 F, where the decision to establish Galatasaray Sports Club was taken, together with Galatasaray High School Manager Murat Develioğlu and signed the founding text of our women's football team.

Nurcan Çelik was appointed as the Technical Director of Galatasaray Women's Football Team on 24 September 2021.

October 2021
Galatasaray Women's Football Team, which was founded at Galatasaray High School and will be among the teams that will compete in the Super League this year, stepped into Florya Metin Oktay Facilities for the first time on 7 October 2021.

Kits

Supplier: Nike
Name sponsor: Hepsiburada
Main sponsor: Hepsiburada

Back sponsor: Tunç Holding
Sleeve sponsor: Arzum

Short sponsor: —
Socks sponsor: Tacirler

Squad information

Transfers and loans

In

Out

Loan in

Loan out

Management team

Pre-season

Competitions

Overall record

Turkish Women's Football Super League

League table ( Group B )

Results summary

Results by matchday

Matches

Statistics

Appearances and goals

Goalscorers

Assists

Clean sheets

Disciplinary records

References

External links
 Galatasaray Kadın Futbol Takımı - GALATASARAY.ORG 

Galatasaray Sports Club 2021–22 season
Galatasaray S.K. (women's football) seasons
Galatasaray